William Henry Lloyd was a Baltimore, Maryland attorney and was the Republican Party candidate for the U.S. House of Representatives from Maryland (1st District) in 1942, defeated by incumbent David J. Ward, the Democratic Party candidate.  He was a founder of the American College of Heraldry and Arms.

References
  Index to Politicians: Lloyd on The Political Graveyard website. 
   Maryland: U.S. Representatives, 1940s on The Political Graveyard website. 
 Coat of arms grant documents, Lyndon Baines Johnson Presidential Library and Museum

Lawyers from Baltimore
Maryland Republicans
American heraldists